SM U-14 was one of the 329 submarines serving in the Imperial German Navy in World War I.

Service history
U-14 was engaged in the naval warfare and took part in the First Battle of the Atlantic. U-14 was damaged by an air raid on the German-occupied port of Zeebrugge, Belgium, on the night of 12 February 1915.

Fate
On 5 June 1915, U-14 approached the trawler Oceanic II off Peterhead, firing a couple of warning shots, but Oceanic II was armed and was acting as a decoy and returned fire, being joined by the armed trawler Hawk. U-14 was hit several times, and, unable to escape by submerging, sank, with six officers and 21 ratings being rescued, and one man, her commanding officer, being killed.

Summary of raiding history

References

Notes

Citations

Bibliography

World War I submarines of Germany
1911 ships
Ships built in Danzig
U-boats commissioned in 1912
Maritime incidents in 1915
U-boats sunk in 1915
U-boats sunk by British warships
World War I shipwrecks in the North Sea
Type U 13 submarines